Arthur von Briesen (July 11, 1843 – May 13, 1920) was a lawyer and philanthropist. He was president of the Legal Aid Society from 1889 to 1916.

Biography
Briesen was born on July 11, 1843 in Borkendorf, Germany (now in Poland) and migrated to the United States in 1858, at the age of 15. In 1873 he married Anna Goepel.

Briesen then began to study law, he enlisted and served as sergeant of Company B of the First New York Volunteers during the American Civil War. After the war, he finished his legal studies at the New York University School of Law and was admitted to the bar for New York state in 1868.

He was president of the Legal Aid Society from 1890 to 1916. His support for Germany during World War I led to his resignation. He was replaced by Charles Evans Hughes.

Briesen died in Manhattan on May 13, 1920 at the Staten Island Ferry Whitehall Terminal while waiting for the ferry to arrive, to commute to his summer house at Fort Wadsworth on Staten Island.

Legacy
His onetime summer estate adjoining Fort Wadsworth on Staten Island, New York City, is now Von Briesen Park, named for him. His papers are archived at Princeton University.

Footnotes

1843 births
1920 deaths
Legal Aid Society
People from Staten Island
New York University School of Law alumni
People of New York (state) in the American Civil War
People from the Province of Silesia
German emigrants to the United States